Bogdan Borza (born 5 April 1997) is a Romanian tennis player.

Borza has a career high ATP singles ranking of 707 achieved on 11 September 2017. He also has a career high ATP doubles ranking of 1073 achieved on 19 June 2017.

Borza represents Romania at the Davis Cup, where he has a W/L record of 1–3.

External links

1997 births
Living people
Romanian male tennis players
People from Cugir
21st-century Romanian people